The 2004 Women's ANZ Hockey Challenge was a women's field hockey event, comprising two four–nations tournaments.  It was held in Darwin and Townsville, from 16 to 27 June 2004.

Australia won both tournaments, defeating New Zealand and Japan in the respective finals.

Competition format
The tournament featured the national teams of Australia, Japan and New Zealand, as well as a team from the Australian Institute of Sport. The teams competed in a double round-robin format, with each team playing each other twice. Three points were awarded for a win, one for a draw, and none for a loss.

Darwin

All times are local (ACST).

Preliminary round

Pool

Fixtures

Classification round

Third and fourth place

Final

Townsville

All times are local (AEST).

Preliminary round

Pool

Fixtures

Classification round

Third and fourth place

Final

Statistics

Final standings

Goalscorers

References

Women's international field hockey competitions